Katja Čerenjak (born 6 September 1983) is a Slovenian handballer who plays for ŽRK Celje and the Slovenian national team.

She participated at the 2016 European Women's Handball Championship.

References

1983 births
Living people
Slovenian female handball players
Sportspeople from Celje
Expatriate handball players
Slovenian expatriate sportspeople in Austria
Mediterranean Games competitors for Slovenia
Competitors at the 2005 Mediterranean Games
Competitors at the 2009 Mediterranean Games